The S.S. Peter & Paul Catholic School in Butte, Nebraska, was listed on the National Register of Historic Places in 1992.

It is a parochial school designed by William L. Steele.  It was built and began operations in 1909, and is a typical example of such schools built in many Catholic communities of Nebraska in the early 20th century.

It is a -story Renaissance Revival style building built upon a raised basement. It was deemed "a good example of a parochial school building".  It was built by Sioux City contractor B.E. Short, with brick work done by Sioux City's Steele Corporation.  It housed children in a dormitory on the top, attic floor.  The second floor provided a music room and quarters for the nuns who taught the school.  The first floor has two large classrooms with double doors that opened into a chapel room in between, and a central hall.  The basement was used for cooking, dining, and laundry.  It is topped by a hipped roof with eight shingled dormers, a shingled belfry, and an air circulation vent with a white metal cross above.

It is located at the southeast corner of the intersection of 2nd and Broadway Streets.

References

External links

Christian schools in Nebraska
Catholic boarding schools in the United States
National Register of Historic Places in Boyd County, Nebraska
Renaissance Revival architecture in Nebraska
School buildings completed in 1909
1909 establishments in Nebraska
School buildings on the National Register of Historic Places in Nebraska